Jerudong  Football Club is a Bruneian football club that plays in the Brunei Super League. With almost 30 years of service, the club has experienced its fair share of highs and lows while competing in the various leagues. 

The club has worked to get better with every win and especially with every loss, starting with the early days of the Brunei-Muara District League and continuing through the current Brunei Super League. Which is not surprising given that their team manager, Jalaludin Ghazali, has always been the club's motivating drive and brings an equal amount of tenacity to winning. The club has continued to develop young players of the greatest caliber thanks to its very high standards in training and organization.

History 
Jerudong FC was founded in 1994, by Murni Mohammad and was started by a group of passionately enthusiastic football players who viewed football as a way to help the young in their community reach their full potential. As they had previously started out as little more than local villagers playing on the field, Jerudong FC draws its membership from across any community that is ready to join them. The membership then expanded beyond families and friends to include children of all ages and can accommodate players of all skill levels, from absolute novices to those with prior experience competing in both youth and adult competitions.

The club takes pleasure in fostering potential and skill in football, boasting a strong roster of highly skilled athletes who have received intensive coaching training. This is because, as a non-profit club, they always do their best to support the team members by giving them access to the appropriate facilities, gear, and equipment to help inspire young people to take an active role in football. This involves arranging friendly games with Malaysia, including Labuan, Sabah, and Sarawak, to provide players a chance to play outside of their comfort zones and to demonstrate their potential and skill on the field.

Football was originally intended to provide a platform for adolescents to engage in more positive activities and stay away from activities that can be harmful to their wellbeing. These days, the club helps its players improve their abilities, techniques, and game knowledge so they can reach their maximum potential and, ultimately, create a route to Brunei representative football. Since then, the club has produced numerous remarkable athletes, many of whom have left Jerudong FC to pursue their own interests both on and off the field.

Jerudong took part in the 2022 FA Cup, managing to qualify for the knockout phase but was defeated by eventual winners DPMM FC.

Ground 
Since their primary playing and training facility is situated on Jerudong Primary School Field, where they would train up to three times a week in preparation for any future matches, the club has strong ties to the community. They are one of the rare clubs that can boast having their own home field.

Current squad

References

Football clubs in Brunei
Association football clubs established in 1994
1994 establishments in Brunei